The tympanic nerve (Jacobson’s nerve) is a branch of the glossopharyngeal nerve found near the ear. It gives sensation to the middle ear, the Eustachian tube, the parotid gland, and mastoid air cells. It gives parasympathetic to supply to the parotid gland via the otic ganglion and the auriculotemporal nerve.

Structure 
The tympanic nerve arises from the inferior ganglion of the glossopharyngeal nerve. It ascends to the tympanic cavity through a small canal, the inferior tympanic canaliculus, on the under surface of the petrous portion of the temporal bone on the ridge which separates the carotid canal from the jugular fossa.

In the tympanic cavity, it divides into branches which form the tympanic plexus and are contained in grooves upon the surface of the promontory.

The tympanic nerve contains sensory axons to the middle ear, including the internal surface of the tympanic membrane. Their cell bodies are found in the superior ganglion of the glossopharyngeal nerve. It also contains parasympathetic axons, which continue as the lesser petrosal nerve to the otic ganglion, which itself gives off postganglionic parasympathetic neurons.

Variation 
The tympanic nerve usually arises from the inferior ganglion of the glossopharyngeal nerve. Rarely, it may arise from a higher part. Rarely, it may provide no parasympathetic fibres to the otic ganglion.

Function 
The tympanic nerve provides sensation to the middle ear (tympanic cavity). This includes the internal surface of the tympanic membrane. It also supplies the Eustachian tube, the parotid gland, and mastoid air cells.

The tympanic nerve also gives parasympathetic supply to the otic ganglion. These neurons then provide secretomotor innervation of the parotid gland via the auriculotemporal nerve. It is involved in the salivatory reflex to increase salivation during chewing.

Clinical significance 
The tympanic nerve is involved in a reflex, where stimulation of the ear canal increases salivation.

Cancer 
The tympanic nerve may be involved by paraganglioma, in this location referred to as a glomus tympanicum tumour. This causes a soft mass in the middle ear (tympanic cavity). There may also be pulsatile tinnitus, hearing loss or hearing problems, and some cardiac abnormalities.

History 
The tympanic nerve is also known as the nerve of Jacobson, or Jacobson's nerve.

Additional images

References

External links 
 Tympanic and Lesser petrosal nerve diagram 
 

Glossopharyngeal nerve